Honda Manufacturing of Indiana (HMIN), also called Indiana Auto Plant (IAP), is an automobile factory located in Greensburg, Indiana.  It builds vehicles for Honda sales in North America. It was founded on March 19, 2007 for the 25th anniversary of the company's own automobile production in the United States. Vehicle production commenced on October 9, 2008, and over two million automobiles have been produced by the plant since that time. Approximately 2,700 associates are currently employed at Honda Manufacturing of Indiana as of 2021. 

The current product line of the plant includes the Honda Civic hatchback, Honda CR-V, and Honda Insight until 2022. Production capacity is 250,000 vehicles annually.

With regard to the purchase of green electricity and the use of wood from the nearby Forest Stewardship Council to heat the hall, the plant received an award from the Green Building Certification Institute. After two years of production, the HMIN received the second award, LEED certification, which is based on the successful use of various recycling technologies.

Vehicles
 Honda Civic (2008-present) 
 Honda CR-V (2017-present)

Previously Produced Vehicles
 Honda Civic Hybrid
 Honda Civic GX NGV (natural gas vehicle)
 Acura ILX (Apr 2012 - Nov 2014)
 Honda Insight (2018-2022)

References

External links 
 Official Website of Honda Manufacturing of Indiana, LLC

Honda factories
Motor vehicle assembly plants in Indiana
Buildings and structures in Decatur County, Indiana